Dokdonella koreensis is a Gram-negative, rod-shaped, non-spore-forming and motile bacterium from the genus of Dokdonella which has been isolated from soil from Dokdo in Korea.

References

Xanthomonadales
Bacteria described in 2006